Scouted is an American reality television series that chronicles the discovery process of the next big name in the modeling industry. The show premiered on Monday, November 28, 2011, on the E! cable network.

Overview
The series showcases local model scouts  Page Parkes (Houston, TX), Stacie Vanchieri (Richmond, VA), Erin Olson (Salt Lake City, UT), and Kristen Kotik (San Francisco, CA) as they try to discover the next big name. The scouts will train the aspiring models and then introduce them to the One Management modeling agency. Then, industry veterans Michael Flutie, Julia Samersova, Beri Smither, and Dani Stahl will evaluate the potential of the models. This process includes a trip to the legendary fashion closet, as well as an intimidating photo shoot with Photographer and Director Danny Christensen. Ultimately, Scott Lipps, president of One Management, will decide whether or not to sign the models to his agency.

Production
E! ordered 8 episodes for the first season. Angela Aguilera, Ben Samek, Cris Abrego, Michael Flutie, and Rabih Gholam serve as executive producers. Danny Christensen manages Fashion Photography and Direction, using RED Epic and with support by B2Pro.

Episodes

References

External links
Scouted Official Website

2011 American television series debuts
2010s American reality television series
E! original programming
English-language television shows
Modeling-themed reality television series
Television series by 51 Minds Entertainment